Galactic Empire is a 1990 space flight simulator computer game by Tomahawk where the player is conquering the universe, roaming from planet to planet. It has a sequel: A.G.E..

External links

1990 video games
Coktel Vision games
Amiga games
DOS games
Video games developed in France